is a feminine Japanese given name which is occasionally spelled .

Possible writings
Naoko can be written using different kanji characters and can mean:
直子, "obedient, child"
尚子, "esteem, child"
奈緒子, "Nara, cord, child"
菜緒子, "greens, cord, child"
奈央子, "Nara, center, child"
菜穂子, "greens, ear (of grain), child"
奈保子, "Nara, keep, child"
奈生子, "Nara, fresh, child"
The name can also be written in hiragana or katakana.

People with the name
Nahoko Kinoshita (菜穂子, born 1980), Japanese actress
Nahoko Kojima (奈保子, born 1981), Japanese paper cut artist
Nahoko Uehashi (菜穂子, born 1962), Japanese writer
, Japanese tennis table player
Naoko Funayama, Japanese American sportscaster
Naoko Hashimoto (born 1984), Japanese volleyball player
Naoko Hayashiba (直子, born 1968), Japanese writer and shogi player
Naoko Iijima (直子, born 1968), Japanese actress
Naoko Imoto (直歩子, born 1976), Japanese freestyle swimmer
Naoko Ishihara (奈央子, born 1974), Japanese sport shooter
Naoko Kamio (born 1967), Japanese suit actor
Naoko Kawai (河合奈保子, born 1963), Japanese singer and actress
Naoko Ken (ナオコ, born 1953), Japanese singer and actress
, Japanese tennis player
Naoko Kouda (直子, born 1959), Japanese voice actress
, Japanese swimmer
Naoko Matsui (菜桜子, born 1961), Japanese voice actress
, Japanese swimmer
Naoko Mori (尚子, born 1971), Japanese actress
, Japanese field hockey player
Naoko Sakamoto (runner) (直子, born 1980), Japanese long-distance runner
Naoko Sakamoto (softball) (直子, born 1985), Japanese softball player
Naoko Sato (直子, born 1955), Japanese tennis player
Naoko Sawamatsu (奈生子, born 1973), Japanese professional tennis player
Naoko Takahashi (尚子, born 1972), Japanese long-distance runner
Naoko Takeuchi (直子, born 1967), Japanese manga artist
Naoko Watanabe (渡辺奈緒子, born 1984), Japanese actress who appeared in Silk
Naoko Watanabe (菜生子, born 1959), Japanese voice actress
Naoko Yamada, (尚子, born 1984), Japanese animator and film director
Naoko Yamano (直子, born 1960), member of the Japanese rock trio Shonen Knife
Naoko Yamazaki (直子, born 1970), Japanese astronaut

Fictional characters
Naoko, a character in the anime series Bubblegum Crisis
Naoko (直子), a character in the novel Norwegian Wood by Haruki Murakami
Naoko, a character in The Revenge of Shinobi (The Super Shinobi)
Naoko Akagi (ナオコ), minor character in the anime series Neon Genesis Evangelion
Naoko Kamikishiro (直子), character in the light novel and manga Boogiepop and Others
Naoko Kawamata, character in the film, The Grudge 3
Naoko Satomi, a main character in the film The Wind Rises
Naoko Yamada (奈緒子), the main heroine of the Japanese TV drama series Trick
Naoko Yanagisawa (奈緒子), character in the anime and manga series Cardcaptor Sakura
Naoko Yasutani, a main character of the novel A Tale for the Time Being by Ruth Ozeki

Japanese feminine given names